Doseido Colony was a small historic settlement which was located in western Wilson County, Texas (USA) one mile north of FM 775, at the intersection of county roads 321 and 361.

See also
Grass Pond Colony, Texas

Sources
"The Good Old Days: a history of LaVernia" by the Civic Government class of LaVernia High School, 1936–1937 school year."
"Wilson County Centennial 1860-1960" By the Wilson county library, Centennial program handed out at The 100yr centennial celebration."
"Segregated schools of Wilson County" Floresville Chronicle Journal May 20, 1971.
"African Americans in Wilson County Texas", Jamie L. Harris, Lynbrook Books, 2006.
"Wilson County History", Diane Jimenez, Taylor Publishing Co. 1990

Ghost towns in South Texas
Geography of Wilson County, Texas